Presstalis, known until December 2009 as Nouvelles Messageries de la Presse Parisienne (NMPP), is a French media distribution corporation. More than 100 newspapers and 3,500 French and foreign magazines are distributed by Presstalis. The company distributes many of the national newspapers of France and nearly 80% of its magazines and multimedia products, using depositories (distribution in France), independent subsidiaries, or local distributors (export distribution).

It is now bankrupt and has ceased operations as of July 1, 2020. Some of its assets will transfer into a new distribution company, France Messagerie.

NMPP was founded on 16 April 1947 according to the loi Bichet. The objective, after the Liberation of France, was to guarantee an economically viable distribution of  newspapers.

Mass media companies of France
Mass media companies established in 1947
Mass media in Paris
French companies established in 1947